The Verknė (known as Galaverknė in the upper reaches) is a  stream in Lithuania.

Its spring is near Rūdiškės in the Trakai District Municipality where it is known as Galaverknė and passes a chain of smaller lakes. Having left the Vilkokšnis lake, the stream is known as Verknė. Aukštadvaris with a population of 977 (2011) is the only larger settlement along the river. Verknė passes the Prienai District Municipality and forms the border of the Birštonas Municipality near its mouth.

In 1960, the Verknė was impounded to create the two reservoirs with hydroelectric power stations. The largest is Aukštadvaris Reservoir (the smaller one being Jundeliškės Reservoir.

Tourism 

The first tour was made and described by the hydrologist Steponas Kolupaila.

The stream is part of two regional parks with several protected areas: Aukštadvaris Regional Park and Nemunas Loops Regional Park. The parks were established in 1992.

A series of 12 hillforts (piliakalnis) is located near the Verknė. Most of these forts were built or expanded between the 10th and 14th centuries.

In Žydkaimis near the Vilkokšnis lake, a Jewish community was active in agriculture since the mid-19th century, even though this was banned in the Russian Empire. The community was supported in the 1930s by ORT. In 1936, the Jews owned 63% of the land in the village, despite emigration.

Basin

The main tributaries are Alšia and Obeltis.

Right tributaries 
Balina
Lėlelė
Guostė
Alšia
Svėdubė

Left tributaries 
Strūzda
Samė
Adinčiava
Vapsa
Obeltis
Dindžiakė

References

Further reading 

 Stanislovas Buchaveckas: Verknė. 1984.
 Steponas Kolupaila: Mūsų vandens keliai. Kaunas 1933. Updated version, Kaunas 1938.

Geography of Kaunas County
Trakai District Municipality
Rivers of Lithuania